The 1961 New York Titans season was the second season for the team in the American Football League (AFL). The Titans finished with a record of 7–7.

Draft picks

Roster

Schedule

Standings

External links
1961 Titans statistics

New York Jets seasons
New York Titans
New York Titans season
Washington Heights, Manhattan
1960s in Manhattan